Jönköpings idrottshus, nicknamed Kåken, is a sports hall in Väster in Jönköping, Sweden. It was opened on 19 November 1939 with a handball game between GoIF Fram and IFK Kristianstad and acts as home ground for club teams like Jönköping City IBK (floorball), IK Cyrus T/S, IF Hallby (handball), Jönköpings IK (floorball) and KFUM Jönköping.

Following criticism for being "too old" by the early 2000s, it was renovated and reopened on 8 September 2012.

References

1939 establishments in Sweden
Sports venues in Jönköping
Sports venues completed in 1939